Anticrepuscular rays, or antisolar rays, are  meteorological optical phenomena similar to crepuscular rays, but appear opposite the Sun in the sky. Anticrepuscular rays are essentially parallel, but appear to converge toward the antisolar point, the vanishing point, due to a visual illusion from linear perspective.

Anticrepuscular rays are most frequently visible around sunrise or sunset. This is because the atmospheric light scattering that makes them visible (backscattering) is larger for low angles to the horizon than most other angles. Anticrepuscular rays are dimmer than crepuscular rays because backscattering is less than forward scattering. 

Anticrepuscular rays can be continuous with crepuscular rays, curving across the whole sky in great circles.

Mountain shadow

A common example of a single anticrepuscular ray is provided by the shadow of a mountain at sunset, when viewed from the summit. It appears to be triangular, whatever the shape of the mountain, with the apex at the antisolar point.

Wagon-wheel spokes

Anticrepuscular rays are sometimes seen enclosed by a rainbow. In this case they can be called wagon-wheel spokes.

See also
 Afterglow
 Earth's shadow

References

External links

Atmospheric optics: anticrepuscular rays
Images of anticrepuscular rays at Astronomy Picture of the Day site (copyrighted images):
Image of anticrepuscular rays in Colorado taken by John Britton
A particularly vivid image taken by Daniel Herron of Woodstock, GA

Atmospheric optical phenomena